Scrobipalpa flavidinigra is a moth in the family Gelechiidae. It was described by Oleksiy V. Bidzilya and Hou-Hun Li in 2010. It is found in China in Inner Mongolia and Ningxia.

The forewings are ochreous brown mottled with black. The black scales are concentrated mainly along the costal margin and in the subapical area. There are two small black dots at the base and two others at the corner of the cell and there is a straight cream subapical fascia at three-quarters, as well as a diffused black patch at the base and a diffused black fascia obliquely from one-quarter of the costal margin to the middle of the wing. The hindwings are light grey. Adults are on wing in July and August.

Etymology
The species name refers to the wing pattern and is derived from Latin flavidus (meaning yellowish) and niger (meaning black).

References

Scrobipalpa
Moths described in 2010